Kalgah (also Romanized as Kalgāh; also known as Kaleh Gāh, Kalgeh, Kalleh Gāh, Shūl, and Skūl-e Kaleh Gāh) is a village in Shesh Pir Rural District, Hamaijan District, Sepidan County, Fars Province, Iran. At the 2006 census, its population was 106, in 18 families.

References 

Populated places in Sepidan County